John Gibson may refer to:

Sports
John Gibson (Nottingham cricketer), English cricketer
John Gibson (cricketer, born 1833) (1833–1892), English priest and cricketer
John Gibson (footballer, born 1967), Scottish football player
John Gibson (footballer, born 1989), footballer who plays for Dundee
John Gibson (ice hockey, born 1959) (1959–2020), Canadian and ex-NHL hockey player, winner of the 1979–1980 Governor's Trophy
John Gibson (ice hockey, born 1993), American ice hockey goaltender
John Gibson (motorcycle racer), 1956 Daytona 200 winner
Johnny Gibson (John Anthony Gibson, 1905–2006), American 400 meter hurdles world record holder
Johnny Gibson (footballer) (born 1950), Scottish footballer (Partick Thistle)

Law and politics
John Arthur Gibson (1850–1912), Six Nations Reserve chief of the Haudenosaunee (Iroquois)
John Gibson (Philadelphia), mayor of Philadelphia, 1771–1773
John Gibson (police officer) (1956–1998), U.S. Capitol police officer killed in the line of duty 1998
John Bannister Gibson (1780–1853), Pennsylvania attorney and judge
John C. Gibson (born 1934), American Republican politician from New Jersey
John R. Gibson (1925–2014), American judge
John S. Gibson Jr. (1902–1987), Los Angeles City Councilman, 1981–1982
John S. Gibson (1893–1960), U.S. Representative from Georgia
John George Gibson (1846–1923), Irish lawyer and Conservative politician
John Lambert Gibson (1906–1986), independent member of the Canadian House of Commons
Sir John Morison Gibson (1842–1929), Attorney-General and Lieutenant Governor of Ontario
John Gibson (Australian politician) (1857–1941), member of the Tasmanian House of Assembly
John Gibson (New Zealand lawyer) (1936–2009), cricket selector and Queen's Counsel

Others
John Gibson (architect) (1817–1892), British architect
John Gibson (cartographer) (1750–1792), English cartographer and engraver
Sir John Gibson (editor and journalist) (1841–1915), Anglo-Welsh journalist and proprietor of The Cambrian News
John Gibson (political commentator) (born 1946), American talk radio host for Fox News Radio
John Gibson (sculptor) (1790–1866), British sculptor
John Gibson (American soldier) (1740–1822), American soldier, Territorial Secretary and acting governor of Indiana Territory, namesake of Gibson County, Indiana
John Gibson (RAF officer) (1916–2000), English aviator and WWII air ace
John Douglas Gibson (1924–1984), Australian amateur ornithologist
John H. Gibson, American soldier of the Natchez Expedition and the Creek War, namesake of Gibson County, Tennessee
John H. Gibson (born 1959), American (Texas) businessman and Assistant Secretary of the Air Force
John T. Gibson  (1878–1937), American businessman and theatre manager and producer of black artists in Philadelphia
Sir John Gibson (British Army officer) (c. 1637–1717), British soldier and politician
Sir John Watson Gibson (1885–1947), English civil engineer
John Gibson (songwriter) (fl. 1812), English poet and songwriter
John Gibson (priest), English priest
John Gibson, former CEO of Tripwire Interactive
John-Michael Gibson, American rapper known professionally as Cash Out

See also
Jack Gibson (disambiguation)
Jon Gibson (disambiguation)